Reid Kikuo Johnson (born in 1981) is an American illustrator and cartoonist. He is known for illustrating several covers of The New Yorker in addition to the graphic novels Night Fisher, The Shark King, and No One Else.

Early life 
Johnson was born and raised on the island of Maui. He studied illustration at the Rhode Island School of Design under cartoonist David Mazzucchelli.

Career 
Johnson began working on his first graphic novel, Night Fisher, while studying at the Rhode Island School of Design. Released in 2005, the semi-autobiographical coming of age story set on Maui won the 2006 Harvey Award for Best New Talent as well as the Russ Manning Award at the 2006 Eisner Awards.

Johnson regularly works in commercial illustration. His artwork first appeared in the pages of The New Yorker in 2006 and on the cover of the magazine in 2016. Several of his illustrations and prints have been acquired by the Library of Congress.

Johnson's all-ages graphic novel, The Shark King, was published in 2012 by Toon Books, and is based on the Hawaiian legend of Nanaue, son of Kāmohoaliʻi.

No One Else, a graphic novella, was published in 2021 by Fantagraphics. It was called "note-perfect" by the New York Times and was included on multiple "best of 2021" lists from major publications. The book won multiple awards including the 2021 LA Times Book Prize, the Ignatz Award for outstanding graphic novel, the Lucca Comics Award for Best Script, and it was named a 2022 Lynd Ward Prize honor book.

Teaching 
Johnson teaches a comics creation class at the Rhode Island School of Design which he began teaching in 2009.

Works

Graphic novels 
Night Fisher (Fantagraphics books, 2005)

The Shark King (Toon Books, 2012, }

No One Else (Fantagraphics books, 2021)

Selected short comics stories 
"Thrustman" (in Project: Superior, 2005 )

"Cher Shimura" (in Mome Vol. 3, 2005 )

"John James Audubon in Pursuit of the Golden Eagle" (in The Believer, Feb 1, 2006)

"Conditioning" (in The New York Times, August 3, 2007)

"Anything But Retail" (in Strange Tales, Marvel Comics, December, 2009)

"Body and Soul" (in The New Yorker, April 3, 2017)

"Uncharted Maui" (in The New Yorker, July 26, 2021)

"Hawaiian Snow"  (in The New York Times, Jan 7, 2022)

Awards 
2022 Ignatz Award Outstanding Graphic Novel for No One Else

2022 Lucca Comics Award Gran Giungi Miglior [Best Script] for Nessun Altro [No One Else]

2022 American Society of Magazine Editors Best Cover Winner in the "News and Politics" category for The New Yorker cover, "Delayed"

2022 Lynd Ward Prize Honor for No One Else

2021 LA Times Book Prize Winner Graphic Novel/Comics for No One Else

2021 Society of Illustrators gold medal in the Editorial category for The New Yorker cover, "Delayed"

2018 Society of Illustrators gold medal in the Editorial category for The New Yorker cover, "Safe Travels"

2017 American Society of Magazine Editors Best Cover Winner in the "Brainiest" category for The New Yorker cover, "Commencement"

2013 Asian/Pacific American Awards for Literature, for The Shark King

2006 Harvey Award, Best New Talent, for Night Fisher

2006 Russ Manning Award, for Night Fisher

References

External links 

Rhode Island School of Design alumni
Alternative cartoonists
American comics artists
American illustrators
The New Yorker cartoonists
21st-century American artists
1981 births
Living people
People from Maui